Modakurichi is a Panchayat town and Taluk headquarters in Erode district in the Indian state of Tamil Nadu. It is located as a suburb of Erode City, at a distance of 15 km from Erode City Central Bus Terminus and 8 km from Solar Bus Station. Karur main road 2 km from modakurichi (Thurapalayam-panjalingapuram).

List of villages 
 Panjalingapuram
 Thurapalayam
 Manjakattuvalasu
 Selambagoundenpalayam
 Unampalam
 Kattupalayam
 Alangakattuvalasu
 Olappalayam
 Velampalayam
 Unjapalayam
 Aluthupalayam
Lakkapuram
 Attavanai Anumanpalli
 Mugasi Anumanpalli

Demographics 
 India census, Modakurichi had a population of 10,036. Males constitute 51% of the population and females 49%. Modakurichi has an average literacy rate of 62%, higher than the national average of 59.5%: male literacy is 72%, and female literacy is 52%. In Modakurichi, 9% of the population is under 6 years of age.

Politics 
Modakurichi assembly constituency is part of Erode (Lok Sabha constituency). In Modakurichi Assembly Constituency of Tamil Nadu there were 1033 contesting candidates during the general election to Tamil Nadu Legislative Assembly in 1996 setting a new record.

Neighborhoods
Erode
Solar
Vilakkethi
Sivagiri
NanchaiUthukkuli
Kaspapettai
Mullamparappu
Avalpoondurai
Moolappalayam
Muthur
Arachalur

References

Cities and towns in Erode district